On 12 January 2019, the main telecommunications provider in Venezuela, CANTV, issued a block against the online encyclopedia, Wikipedia. All of CANTV's 1.5 million users were affected by the decision. The block was lifted on 18 January 2019, following widespread criticism against the state-owned company, claiming it was in response to the Venezuelan presidential crisis.

The block coincided with Juan Guaidó's claims to become acting president during the beginning of the Venezuelan presidential crisis. During the crisis, several Internet outages were reported as well as the blocking of multiple websites, including Wikipedia.

Wikimedia Venezuela reported another block of Wikipedia on 23 January 2019.

Context

The Wikipedia block occurred in the midst of several edit wars on the Spanish Wikipedia articles of Nicolás Maduro, Juan Guaidó, President of Venezuela and List of presidents of Venezuela. The edit wars were in conflict over edits by both registered users and anonymous IP users, with different opinions on the re-election of Maduro as president of Venezuela from 2019, the assumption of the presidency by Guaidó, as well as about the chronology of the presidency. Initial edits claimed that Guaidó declared himself president, with following wars removing this information.

Block
On the afternoon of 12 January 2019, the NetBlocks Internet observatory collected technical evidence of the blocking of all versions of Wikipedia in Venezuela. The restrictions were implemented by CANTV, the largest telecommunications provider in the country. NetBlocks identified a major disruption to the network affecting the telecommunications infrastructure, which coincided with other restrictions affecting the ability of Venezuelans to access information in the previous 24 hours. It was believed that the reason was an attempt to hide or suppress the Wikipedia article of the newly appointed president of the National Assembly, Juan Guaidó, who included him as "51st President of the Bolivarian Republic of Venezuela." The information collected also shows several websites that had recently been restricted, meaning that political instability in the country may be the main motive for the control of the Internet.

The Observatory VE without filters (Spanish: VE sin Filtro) also collected information about the block, showing that it was an irregularly effective block, an HTTP filtering block according to the SNI (Server Name Indication), preventing a connection to the server from being established with high frequency. The group reported that they thought that the block had ended on 13 January at 4:50pm, but the blocking methods showed up later, and they deleted the tweet with the incorrect information.

Similarly, several media outlets suggested that Wikipedia directly or indirectly was taking sides with either group.

Reactions

Wikimedia Foundation
On 13 January, the Wikimedia Foundation said that they were opening an investigation into the ongoing event, and that they were still receiving web traffic and edits from Venezuela at the same time.

Wikimedia Venezuela
In a statement,  announced:

Government
On 15 January, Nicolás Maduro spoke about Wikipedia and said that the opposition was "aiming to garner political power and become president of the Wikipedia Republic, of the Twitter Republic", in reference to the edit wars that took place surrounding the appointment of Juan Guaidó as president in the midst of the presidential crisis. Maduro added "There they are with their Wikipedia and their Twitter".

William Castillo, former president of the National Commission of Telecommunications (Conatel) and current deputy minister of International Communication denied the block of Wikipedia, and alleged that it was a DoS attack against the site, to discredit the Venezuelan government.

See also

2019 Venezuelan presidential crisis
Block of Wikipedia in Turkey
Censorship in Venezuela
Censorship of Wikipedia

Notes

References

2019 in computing
2019 in Venezuela
Crisis in Venezuela
Venezuela
Information operations and warfare
Internet censorship
Political and cultural purges
Censorship in Venezuela